Quest for Camelot (released internationally as The Magic Sword: Quest for Camelot) is a 1998 American animated musical fantasy film produced by Warner Bros. Feature Animation and directed by Frederik Du Chau and very loosely based on the 1976 novel The King's Damosel by Vera Chapman. It features the voices of Jessalyn Gilsig, Cary Elwes, Gary Oldman, Eric Idle, Don Rickles, Jaleel White, Jane Seymour, Pierce Brosnan, Gabriel Byrne, John Gielgud (his final film), Frank Welker and Sarah Rayne. Andrea Corr, Bryan White, Celine Dion and Steve Perry perform the singing voices for Gilsig, Elwes, Seymour and Brosnan.

In May 1995, the film, initially titled The Quest for the Holy Grail, was announced to be Warner Bros. Feature Animation's first project, with Bill Kroyer as director. The film went into production later that year, but was delayed when animators were reassigned to help finish Space Jam (1996). During the interim, the story was heavily re-tooled, among of which the central focus on the Holy Grail would be replaced with Excalibur. This resulted in creative differences, in which Kroyer was replaced with Du Chau. This was later followed with prominent departures of the animation and management staff. Because of the production troubles, the film's release was delayed by six months, from November 1997 to May 1998. Animation was mostly done in Glendale, California and London, England.

Quest for Camelot was released by Warner Bros. under their Family Entertainment label on May 15, 1998 in the United States and Canada. It received mixed reviews and was an "expensive flop", grossing $38.1 million against a $40 million budget. One of the songs, "The Prayer", won the Golden Globe Award for Best Original Song and was nominated for an Academy Award for Best Original Song, losing to "When You Believe" from The Prince of Egypt.

Plot

Sir Lionel is a knight of the Round Table who is killed foiling an assassination attempt on King Arthur by the evil Sir Ruber. Ruber is then driven off by Excalibur, Arthur's sword. At Lionel's funeral, Arthur tells Lionel's daughter Kayley and his wife Juliana that they will always be welcome at Camelot. Kayley dreams of becoming a Knight, like her father, and trains herself while working on their farm. 

A decade later, Ruber's griffin attacks Camelot, where he steals Excalibur and injures King Arthur. Merlin's pet falcon, Ayden, attacks the griffin, causing it to drop the sword into the Forbidden Forest. The Griffin is driven away by the forest's sentient trees. When Kayley hears the news she plans to search for Excalibur herself, which displeases her mother. Ruber attacks the farm and captures Kayley and Juliana, planning to use them to gain entry to Camelot. He uses a witch's potion to turn his henchmen into steel men and a henpecked rooster into Bladebeak. After hearing Ruber's plans, Kayley escapes and heads to the forest, pursued by the steel men and Bladebeak. Once in the forest, Kayley is saved by Garrett, a blind hermit, and Ayden. They decide to search for Excalibur, and Kayley persuades him to let her join the quest. Ruber learns of this from Bladebeak and decides to follow them in order to obtain Excalibur.

Kayley and Garrett encounter a wisecracking two-headed dragon named Devon and Cornwall, whose two heads can't stand each other and dream of being separated, and can neither fly nor breathe fire. They escape from a group of attacking dragons, who are taken out by Ruber and his henchmen, and Devon and Cornwell join their quest. During a night of rest (much to Kayley's reluctance), Garrett reveals he was once King Arthur's stable boy, who wanted to be a knight. He was kicked in the head while saving the King's horses from a fire, causing his blindness. Following the incident, Sir Lionel still believed in Garrett and trains him personally. Garrett also teaches Kayley more about the forest, including the existence of magic healing plants.

The next day, they only find the belt and scabbard of Excalibur in a giant footprint. Kayley's frustrated ranting causes Garrett to miss Ayden's signal, and he is injured by one of Ruber's men. Kayley uses the sentient trees to trap Ruber and his men, and escorts Garrett into a remote cave where she uses a healing plant to heal Garrett's wounds. Kayley and Garrett reconcile and profess their love for each other. The next day, the group goes into a giant cave where a rock-like ogre holds Excalibur, using it as a toothpick. They snatch Excalibur and flee from Ruber in the process.

They reach the end of the forest, but Garrett decides to stay behind, claiming he doesn't belong in Camelot, and gives Excalibur to Kayley. Ruber captures Kayley, takes Excalibur and fuses it with his right arm. He imprisons Kayley in the wagon with Juliana. Devon and Cornwall, who witness this, rush to Garrett and convince him to save Kayley. By working together for the first time, Devon and Cornwall are able to fly and breathe fire, and they fly Garrett to Camelot. Bladebeak reconciles with his constantly henpecking hen and frees Kayley from her ropes, and she warns the guards of Ruber's trap, exposing him and his steel men. Garrett, Devon and Cornwall arrive shortly after and come to her aid. Kayley and Garrett enter the castle while Devon and Cornwall rescue Ayden from the Griffin by breathing fire at the creature.

Inside, Kayley and Garrett find Ruber attempting to kill Arthur with Excalibur, gloating about how all-powerful he has become now. They intervene and trick Ruber into returning Excalibur to its stone, causing its magic to disintegrate Ruber, revert the steel men, including Bladebeak, back to normal and temporarily separate Devon and Cornwall, but they decide to end up back together again. Later, with Camelot restored to its former glory, Kayley and Garrett marry and both become Knights of the Round Table before they ride off into the distance together on their horse.

Voice cast
 Jessalyn Gilsig as Kayley, a young woman who aspires to be a knight.
 Andrea Corr as Kayley's singing voice.
 Sarah Rayne as young Kayley.
 Cary Elwes as Garrett, a blind hermit who joins Kayley's quest.
 Bryan White as Garrett's singing voice.
 Gary Oldman as Lord Ruber, a former knight plotting to steal Excalibur in order to become king of Camelot.
 Eric Idle and Don Rickles as Devon and Cornwall, a comic relief two-headed dragon whom Kayley and Garrett meet. Devon is tall, intellectual and polite, while Cornwall is short, idiotic and wisecracking.
 Jane Seymour as Juliana, Kayley's widowed mother, who doubts Kayley being a knight.
 Celine Dion as Juliana's singing voice.
 Pierce Brosnan as King Arthur, the legendary King of England who resides in Camelot.
 Steve Perry as King Arthur's singing voice.
 Bronson Pinchot as Griffin, Ruber's pet and enforcer.
 Jaleel White as Bladebeak, a rooster who is transformed with an axe by Ruber.
 Gabriel Byrne as Sir Lionel, Kayley's father who is killed by Ruber.
 Sir John Gielgud as Merlin, a wizard and Arthur's advisor.
 Frank Welker as Ayden, Merlin's pet falcon that guides Garrett.

Production
In May 1995, The Quest for the Grail was Warner Bros. Feature Animation's first announced project. Bill Kroyer and Frederik Du Chau were announced as the directors, with Sue Kroyer serving as co-producer. The initial story centered around a young female character named Susannah who embarks on a dangerous quest for the Holy Grail to save her sister from a ruthless and powerful knight. The film was put into production before the story was finalized. However, during the fall of 1995, the animators were reassigned to finish Space Jam (1996). Meanwhile, in April 1996, Christopher Reeve was cast as King Arthur. During the interim, several story changes were made that resulted in creative differences between the Kroyers and the studio management. In particular, the Holy Grail was replaced with Excalibur, in which Warner Bros. Feature Animation president Max Howard felt better reflected the film's setting: "The symbol of Camelot is the power of Excalibur, and that became a more interesting theme: Whoever held the sword, held the power." By the middle of 1996, the Kroyers were allegedly fired by Howard, who later moved on to developing another project at Warner Bros. Feature Animation.

Following the departure of the Kroyers, two supervising animators along with several employees in the studio's art department subsequently left the project. The film's initial producer, Frank Gladstone, left the project in February 1997 and was replaced with Dalisa Cohen. Effects supervisor Michel Gagné recalled that "People were giving up. The head of layout was kicked out, the head of background, the executive producer, the producer, the director, the associate producer—all the heads rolled. It's kind of a hard environment to work in." Eventually, Du Chau was promoted to be the film's director. Meanwhile, Reeve was replaced by Pierce Brosnan when he became unavailable to record new dialogue.

In an article in Animation Magazine, Chrystal Klabunde, the leading animator of Garrett, stated, "It was top heavy. All the executives were happily running around and playing executive, getting corner offices—but very few of them had any concept about animation at all, about doing an animated film. It never occurred to anybody at the top that they had to start from the bottom and build that up. The problems were really coming at the inexperience of everyone involved. Those were people from Disney that had the idea that you just said, 'Do it,' and it gets done. It never occurred to them that it got done because Disney had an infrastructure in place, working like clockwork. We didn't have that." Reportedly, "cost overruns and production nightmares" led the studio to "reconsider their commitment to feature animation." Filmmaker Brad Bird (who helmed The Iron Giant, Warner Bros.' next animated film) thought that micromanaging, which he said had worked well for Disney but not for Warner Bros., had been part of the problem.

Animation
The film was mainly animated at the main Warner Bros. Feature Animation facility located in Glendale, California and London, England. In January 1996, the London animation studio was opened where more than 50 animators were expected to animate 20 minutes of animation, which would be sent back to Glendale to be inked-and-painted. Additional studios that worked on the film included Yowza! Animation in Toronto, Ontario, where they assisted in clean-up animation, Heart of Texas Productions in Austin, and A. Film A/S in Copenhagen where, along with London, about a quarter of the film was animated overseas. The supervising animators were Athanassios Vakalis for Kayley, Chrystal Klabunde for Garrett, Cynthia Overman for Juliana, Alexander Williams for Ruber, Dan Wagner for Devon and Cornwall, Stephan Franck for the Griffin and Bladebeak, and Mike Nguyen for Ayden.

To create the rock-like ogre and other computer-generated effects, the production team used Silicon Graphics' Alias Research software. According to Katherine Percy, the head of CGI effects, the software was originally designed for special effects used in live-action films.

Music

On January 31, 1996, Carole Bayer Sager and David Foster were attached to compose several songs for the film. The album peaked at #117 on the Billboard 200, and won the Golden Globe Award for Best Original Song for "The Prayer". The song was also nominated for the Academy Award for Best Original Song, though it lost to "When You Believe" from DreamWorks' The Prince of Egypt.

On the soundtrack, "The Prayer" was performed separately by Celine Dion in English, and by Andrea Bocelli in Italian. The now better-known Dion-Bocelli duet in both languages first appeared in October 1998 on Dion's Christmas album These Are Special Times; it was also released as a single in March 1999 and on Bocelli's album Sogno in April 1999.

"Looking Through Your Eyes" was the lead single for the soundtrack. Other original songs composed for the film include "United We Stand", "On My Father's Wings", "Ruber", "I Stand Alone", and "If I Didn't Have You". The soundtrack also includes pop versions of "Looking Through Your Eyes" and "I Stand Alone" performed by LeAnn Rimes and Steve Perry, respectively.

Songs
Original songs performed in the film include:

Release
The film was originally slated for November 14, 1997, but was pushed to May 15, 1998, to give the production team more time to finish the film.

Marketing
The film was accompanied with a marketing campaign with promotional licensees including Tyson Foods, Kraft Foods, Frito-Lay, Kodak, Act II Popcorn, and Kenner Products. The fast food restaurant Wendy's had toys based on the characters included in a kid's meal, while Kodak had print advertisements on over 200 million photo processing envelopes. Warner Bros. also partnered with Scholastic to produce children's books based on the film.

Home media
Quest for Camelot was released on VHS and DVD by Warner Home Video in the United States and Canada on October 13, 1998. The VHS edition includes a teaser trailer for Warner Bros. and Morgan Creek Productions' The King and I (1999) and the Tom and Jerry cartoon, "The Two Mouseketeers", while the DVD included several making-of documentaries with interviews of the filmmakers and cast and a music video of "I Stand Alone". To help promote the home video release of the film, Warner Bros. partnered with Act II, American Express, Best Western Hotels, CoinStar, Continental Airlines, Smucker's, and UNICEF, which advertised its trick-or-treat donation boxes before Halloween arrived.

Reception

Critical response
On Rotten Tomatoes, the film has an approval rating of 43% based on 30 reviews, with an average rating of 5.2/10. The website's critical consensus reads, "Diminished by uneven animation and treacly songs, Quest for Camelot is an adventure that ought to be tossed back to the Lady in the Lake." On Metacritic, the film has an average score of 50 based on 22 reviews, indicating "mixed or average reviews". Audiences surveyed by CinemaScore gave the film a B+ on a grade scale from A to F.

Owen Gleiberman, reviewing for Entertainment Weekly, wrote, "The images are playful and serviceably lush, but the story and characters might have come out of a screenwriting software program, and the songs (sung by Celine Dion and Steve Perry, among others) are Vegas-pop wallpaper." David Kronke of the Los Angeles Times described the film as "formulaic" and wrote that it was "a nearly perfect reflection of troubling trends in animated features". He called Kayley "a standard-issue spunky female heroine" and said that "Garrett's blindness is the one adventurous element to the film, but even it seems calculated; his lack of sight is hardly debilitating, yet still provides kids a lesson in acceptance."

Critical of the story, animation, characters, and music, James Berardinelli of ReelViews wrote that the film was "dull, uninspired, and, worst of all, characterized by artwork that could charitably be called 'unimpressive. Stephen Holden of The New York Times wrote, "Coming on the heels of 20th Century Fox's lush but silly Anastasia (a much better film than this one), Quest for Camelot suggests that Disney still owns the artistic franchise on animated features." Kevin J. Harty, an editor of a collection of essays titled Cinema Arthuriana, says that the film is "slightly indebted to, rather than, as Warner publicity claims, actually based on" Chapman's novel.

Peter Stack of the San Francisco Chronicle said that the film is "a spirited adventure with generous romantic and comic charms" that "aims to please a range of ages, with loopy gags, corny romance, an oversized villain and catchy tunes performed by Celine Dion and LeAnn Rimes, among others." Joe Leydon of Variety considered the film as a "lightweight but likable fantasy that offers a playfully feminist twist to Arthurian legends" and noted that the "animation, though not quite up to Disney standards, is impressive enough on its own terms to dazzle the eye and serve the story."

Box office
Quest for Camelot grossed $6 million on its opening weekend, ranking third behind The Horse Whisperer and Deep Impact. The film ultimately grossed $22.5 million during its theatrical run in North America. Cumulatively, the film grossed $38.1 million worldwide. The studio lost about $40 million on the film.

Accolades

The film is recognized by American Film Institute in these lists:
 2004: AFI's 100 Years...100 Songs:
 "The Prayer" – Nominated

Adaptations

Stage adaptation

Prior to the release of the film, Warner Bros. had plans to make a stage adaptation of the film that would tour around to different renaissance fairs throughout the United States, as well as a nightly fireworks show for Six Flags Great Adventure. Both shows were designed by SLG Design & Creative Talent and Steve Gilliam.

The touring aspect of the project was cancelled soon after the film's release due to poor box office performance and the tour's anticipated cost, but the nightly firework show did end up coming to fruition. Quest for Camelot Nights debuted at Six Flags Great Adventure in 1998, and ran through 2001.

The show told the story of the film, with much of the film's main characters appearing as live characters in the show. The film's musical numbers were acted out with scenes from the film displayed with projections onto the show's "water curtains".

Audiobook
The Quest for Camelot Audio Action-Adventure was a follow along audiobook based on the film. Released April 7, 1998, the interactive story features two new songs that weren't included in the movie, Camelot and To Be a Knight. Initially announced in 1996, the audiobook was scheduled to be released October 1997, but was delayed until April 1998. The story was narrated by Val Bettin.

Video games

The first video game was titled Quest for Camelot and is an action-adventure video game developed and published by Titus Interactive with assistance from Nintendo for the Game Boy Color in 1998. A Nintendo 64 version of the game was planned, but was scrapped due to the film's performance at the box office. The second video game was titled Quest for Camelot: Dragon Games is a computer game developed by Knowledge Adventure, it gives the player the ability to explore Camelot after the events of the film. In addition to exploring the world, the player gets to raise a dragon egg and watch it grow.

See also
 List of Warner Bros. theatrical animated features
 List of films based on Arthurian legend

References

External links

 
 
 
 
 
 
 

1998 films
1998 animated films
1990s American animated films
1990s fantasy adventure films
1990s musical films
American children's animated adventure films
American children's animated comedy films
American children's animated fantasy films
American children's animated musical films
American fantasy adventure films
American musical fantasy films
1990s English-language films
Animated films based on novels
Animated films about dragons
Arthurian animated films
1990s feminist films
Films scored by Patrick Doyle
Films about blind people
Films based on British novels
Films set in England
Films set in the Middle Ages
Warner Bros. films
Warner Bros. animated films
Warner Bros. Animation animated films
1998 directorial debut films
1990s children's animated films
Films directed by Frederik Du Chau